Craig Blackman (born 25 March 1951) is a Canadian sprinter. He competed in the men's 4 × 400 metres relay at the 1972 Summer Olympics.

References

External links
 

1951 births
Living people
Athletes (track and field) at the 1971 Pan American Games
Athletes (track and field) at the 1972 Summer Olympics
Canadian male sprinters
Olympic track and field athletes of Canada
Black Canadian track and field athletes
Athletes from Toronto
Pan American Games track and field athletes for Canada